Radosław Pindiur (born January 29, 1988 in Morąg), is a Canadian-Polish footballer who plays for Świt Krzeszowice.

Career
Pindiur began his career in Canada with York Jets and was than scouted from Wisła Kraków, in Winter 2009 was loaned out to Stal Poniatowa, he went than on 14 July 2009 on trial to OKS 1945 Olsztyn.

Personal life
He was born in Mrągowo, at the age of 9 moved with his family to Toronto, Canada. At age 16 went back to Poland, this time Kraków
to play for Wisła Kraków SSA. Earned bachelor's degree from physical education at Wszechnica Świętokrzyska in Kielce and currently 
studies International Business at the Cracow University of Economics.

References

External links
 

1988 births
Living people
Polish footballers
Wisła Kraków players
Canadian expatriate soccer players
Canadian soccer players
Association football midfielders
People from Morąg
Polish emigrants to Canada
Soccer players from Toronto
Sportspeople from Warmian-Masurian Voivodeship